The fourth season of the American television series Bones premiered on September 3, 2008, with a two-hour episode and concluded on May 14, 2009, on Fox. The show changed time slots again, airing on Wednesdays at 8:00 pm ET before moving to Thursdays at 8:00 pm ET in 2009. The season consisted of 26 episodes and averaged 10.8 million viewers.

Cast and characters

Main cast 
Emily Deschanel as Dr. Temperance "Bones" Brennan, a forensic anthropologist
David Boreanaz as FBI Special Agent Seeley Booth, the official FBI liaison with the Jeffersonian
Michaela Conlin as Angela Montenegro, a forensic artist
Tamara Taylor as Dr. Camille Saroyan, a forensic pathologist and the head of the forensic division
T. J. Thyne as Dr. Jack Hodgins, an entomologist
John Francis Daley as Dr. Lance Sweets, an FBI psychologist who studies the relationship between Dr. Brennan and Agent Booth

Recurring cast 
David Greenman as Marcus Geier, a forensic technician
Patricia Belcher as Caroline Julian, a prosecutor
Brendan Fehr as Jared Booth, Booth's brother
Marisa Coughlan as FBI Agent Payton Perotta
Nichole Hiltz as Roxie Lyon, Angela’s girlfriend
Tuppence Middleton as Vera Waterhouse
Eric Millegan as Dr. Zack Addy
Ryan O'Neal as Max Keenan, Brennan's father
Ty Panitz as Parker Booth, Booth's son
Stephen Fry as Dr. Gordon Wyatt, Booth's former psychiatrist
Billy Gibbons as Angela's father
Deirdre Lovejoy as Heather Taffet

Interns
Eugene Byrd as Dr. Clark Edison
Ryan Cartwright as Vincent Nigel-Murray
Michael Grant Terry as Wendell Bray
Carla Gallo as Daisy Wick
Joel David Moore as Colin Fisher
Pej Vahdat as Arastoo Vaziri
Michael Badalucco as Scott Starret

Episodes 
The season premieres with its first two-part episode, "Yanks in the U.K." which was filmed on-location in the United Kingdom. Due to the season's extended episode count of 26 and multiple pre-emptions, Fox aired seven episodes throughout the month of April 2009, with new episodes airing on Monday and Wednesday, along with its regular timeslot of Thursday. This season sees the return of The Grave Digger, who was last seen in the second season. This time, The Grave Digger captures Booth. After Booth is rescued, the team discovers the true identity of The Grave Digger.

DVD and Blu-ray release 
The fourth season of Bones was released on DVD (subtitled "Body Bag Edition") in region 1 on October 6, 2009, in region 2 on October 26, 2009 and in region 4 on October 27, 2009. This was the first season to be released on Blu-ray, and was only released in region A alongside the region 1 DVD release. The region 1 DVD set only includes 22 episodes of season four, as the first four episodes of the season were made available as bonus episodes on the season three DVD set. While the Blu-ray release, and the region 2 and 4 versions include all 26 episodes of the season. Special features include two featurettes—"Androgyny: Playing Haru Tanaka" and "Squints in Training"; three extended episodes—"The Perfect Pieces in the Purple Pond", "The Doctor in the Den" and "The Girl in the Mask". Also included are deleted scenes and a gag reel.

References 

General references

External links 
 
 

2008 American television seasons
2009 American television seasons
Season 04